Ndidi Winifred (born 22 September 1988) is a Nigerian weightlifter. She competed in the women's 58 kg event at the 2014 Commonwealth Games where she won a silver medal.

References 

1988 births
Living people
Nigerian female weightlifters
Commonwealth Games silver medallists for Nigeria
Commonwealth Games medallists in weightlifting
Weightlifters at the 2014 Commonwealth Games
21st-century Nigerian women
Medallists at the 2014 Commonwealth Games